Sarma Sedleniece (born November 4, 1939) is a Latvian chess master who won the Latvian Chess Championship for women in 1968.

Sarma Sedleniece started to play chess at the age of 13 and won the Latvian Girl championship for the first time at the age of 15 and was successful winning the same title three more times (1955–1957). Rīga women chess championship she won also four times: 1959, 1960, 1969 and 1970.
She won the Latvian Chess Championship for women in 1968, was the runner-up in 1971 and won the third prize in 1972. In 1971 she played for Latvia team "Daugava" at eighth board in Soviet team chess cup in Rostov-on-Don.
Sarma Sedleniece is also a very good correspondence chess player and won the first Latvian correspondence chess championship for women in 1969–1970.

References

 Žuravļevs, N.; Dulbergs, I.; Kuzmičovs, G. (1980), Latvijas šahistu jaunrade, Rīga, Avots., pp. 106 – 107 (in Latvian).

External links
 
 S. Sedlenietse player profile at OlimpBase.org (Soviet Team Chess Cup)

1939 births
Living people
Sportspeople from Riga
Latvian female chess players
Soviet female chess players